Reeder Township is a civil township of Missaukee County in the U.S. state of Michigan. As of the 2010 census, the township population was 1,128.

Communities
 The city of Lake City is situated at the northwest corner of the township along the east shore of Lake Missaukee and incorporates land in sections 6 and 7 of Reeder Township. Lake City was at first known as "Reeder", after Daniel Reeder, who built the first log cabin on what was then known as Lake Muskrat. The Lake City post office, with ZIP code 49651, also serves the northern half of Reeder Township.
 The city of McBain is to the south, and the McBain post office with ZIP code 49657 also serves much of southern Reeder Township.
 The community of Falmouth is to the southeast, and the Falmouth post office with ZIP code 49632 also serves the southeast corner of Reeder Township.
The post office operated from March 23, 1900, until June 15, 1903.

Geography

Highways
 forms most of the entire northernmost boundary of the township.
, which runs conterminous with M-55, forms the western boundary of the township.

Demographics
, there were 1,112 people, 394 households, and 321 families residing in the township. There were 535 housing units at an average density of 15.3 per square mile (5.9/km). The racial makeup of the township was 97.03% White, 1.44% Native American, 0.09% Asian, 0.27% from other races, and 1.17% from two or more races. Hispanic or Latino of any race were 1.35% of the population.

There were 394 households, out of which 39.3% had children under the age of 18 living with them, 71.1% were married couples living together, 5.8% had a female householder with no husband present, and 18.5% were non-families. 14.5% of all households were made up of individuals, and 5.3% had someone living alone who was 65 years of age or older.  The average household size was 2.82 and the average family size was 3.08.

In the township the population was spread out, with 30.3% under the age of 18, 7.7% from 18 to 24, 28.7% from 25 to 44, 21.4% from 45 to 64, and 11.9% who were 65 years of age or older.  The median age was 34 years. For every 100 females, there were 109.4 males.  For every 100 females age 18 and over, there were 106.1 males.

The median income for a household in the township was $33,424, and the median income for a family was $35,192. Males had a median income of $30,417 versus $19,583 for females. The per capita income for the township was $13,962.  About 7.7% of families and 10.6% of the population were below the poverty line, including 9.3% of those under age 18 and 15.3% of those age 65 or over.

References

Townships in Missaukee County, Michigan
Townships in Michigan